The September 11 National Day of Service and Remembrance or 9/11 Day is a federally-recognized National Day of Service that happens in the United States on the anniversary of the September 11, 2001 terrorist attacks. Originally founded by the 9/11 nonprofit MyGoodDeed (d.b.a. 9/11 Day), the September 11 National Day of Service and Remembrance later became federally recognized and authorized as a Day of Service passage of the Edward M. Kennedy Serve America Act, which was adopted on a bipartisan basis by the U.S. Congress in 2009. Later that year, President Barack Obama amended the Patriot Day Presidential Proclamation, first established by President George W. Bush, officially designating September 11 as a National Day of Service and Remembrance. Surveys conducted by MyGoodDeed claim that approximately 35 million Americans observe 9/11 Day by engaging in some form of charitable service, making 9/11 Day the largest annual day of charitable service in the United States. The September 11 National Day of Service and Remembrance and Martin Luther King, Jr.'s birthday, are the only Days of Service officially recognized and established under federal law and Presidential Proclamation.

Purpose
According to the nonprofit MyGoodDeed, the purpose of the September 11 National Day of Service and Remembrance is to transform the anniversary of 9/11 from a day of tragedy into a day of doing good. "We wanted to make sure the terrorists didn't have the last word in forever defining for generations to how America would remember and observe 9/11," said 9/11 Day and MyGoodDeed co-founder David Paine. "We wanted instead to honor the victims and those who rose in service by keeping alive the spirit of unity and service that arose in the immediate aftermath of the September 11 attacks."

History
The idea of turning September 11 into an annual day of service was originally conceived in early 2002 by David Paine, at that time a public relations executive who had grown up in New York City. Later that year, David was joined by his friend Jay Winuk to form the nonprofit group One Day's Pay. Jay's younger brother Glenn J. Winuk, at attorney at Holland & Knight LLP, and a volunteer firefighter affiliated with the Jericho Fire Department, had been killed in the line of duty while participating in the rescue efforts. He was killed when the World Trade Center South Tower Collapsed. Glenn's remains were found approximately six months later, in what remained of the South Tower Lobby area, alongside other first responders, with a medic kit he had borrowed on the scene. In 2007, the name of the organization was changed to MyGoodDeed. In 2011, in observance of the tenth anniversary of the September 11 attacks, MyGoodDeed joined with other national service organizations in helping to organize what was then considered to be the largest day of charitable service in U.S. history, with more than 30 million Americans participating, according to research conducted by Horizon Consumer Science on behalf of MyGoodDeed. Today, 9/11 Day continues to engage over 30 million Americans annually in various forms of charitable service, including volunteering, donations to charities, and simple good deeds.

Activities
Activities by volunteers on this federally-recognized National Day of Service and Remembrance have traditionally happened largely on a grassroots level across the nation, through service projects organized by local nonprofits, employers, and faith groups and others. Many people share their plans and messages through social media on 9/11 using the hashtag #911Day. Additionally many schools and students now engage in service-related activities as part of lessons about the history of 9/11 Day. Beginning in 2016, MyGoodDeed started organizing its own, large-scale service projects in major cities. These events are known as 9/11 Day Meal Packs, where volunteers from local organizations and companies spend time during the day on 9/11 assembling non-perishable meals for people who are food insecure. MyGoodDeed typically partners with local volunteer service organizations and Feeding America-affiliated food banks to put on these events. In 2019, approximately 10,000 volunteers participated at eight 9/11 Day Meal Packs, assembling 3.1 million meals that were then donated to people in need. MyGoodDeed has said it plans to establish 9/11 Meal Packs in as many as 20 cities in time for the 20th Anniversary of the 9/11 attacks in 2021.

See also 
 Global Youth Service Day
 Good Deeds Day
 Mandela Day
 MLK Day of Service
 Mitzvah Day
 National Volunteer Week (USA)

References

External links
Official website

Aftermath of the September 11 attacks
September observances
Observances in the United States